Beixiaoying Town is one of the 19 towns of Shunyi District, Beijing. It shares border with Yangsong Town to the north, Mulin Town to the east, Yang and Nancai Towns to the south, Shuangfeng Subdistrict and Niulanshan Town to the west. As of 2020, it had a total population of 42,805.

The name Beixiaoying originated from the Han dynasty, when the then Yuyang Commander Zhang Kan (张堪) established two military station in the region, and Beixiaoying is evolved from the northern settlement.

History

Administrative divisions 
In 2021, Beixiaoying Town was composed of 19 subdivisions, more specifically 2 communities and 17 villages:

Landmark 

 Shunyi Olympic Rowing-Canoeing Park

Gallery

See also 

 List of township-level divisions of Beijing

References 

Towns in Beijing
Shunyi District